Sheppard Robson (previously Richard Sheppard, Robson & Partners ) is a British architecture firm, founded in 1938 by Sir Richard Herbert Sheppard, with offices in London, Manchester, and Glasgow]. It was particularly influential in the 1950s–1960s, pioneering the use of concrete shell structures, and in the present day as a leader in sustainable architecture, building the UK's first net zero carbon house in 2007 as well as designing the LEED Platinum Siemens Middle East Headquarters at Masdar City, which completed in 2014. The latter project was cited as exemplifying "a new generation [that] has emerged [at the practice], which is balancing performance, especially of the sustainable variety, with form" . The practice has offices in London, Manchester and Glasgow and in the 2000s established an award-winning interior design group, ID:SR Sheppard Robson.

History
Sheppard Robson was founded in 1938 by Richard Sheppard, a technically skilled designer with a talent for developing new materials, who was disabled as a teenager by polio, and Jean Shufflebottom, his wife, a gifted architect in her own right. The company's first big success was the Jicwood Bungalow in 1944, which used materials from aircraft manufacture.

By 1950 the company had built a reputation for large modern projects, and Richard Sheppard had a new business partner, Geoffrey Robson, who added his name to the Practice. At first they specialised in schools, building more than 80 in the 1950s. In 1958 the Practice won a competition to design a science college and memorial to Winston Churchill – Churchill College, Cambridge. Later they branched out into other public buildings, and by the 1970s had built a strong reputation in commercial, university and retail buildings.

Sheppard was knighted for his work in architecture,

In the 1990s and 2000s the firm entered a period of growth with often large-scale buildings like The Helicon, Toyota/Lexus HQ, MediaCityUK, the Lighthouse, Barking Riverside and Siemens HQ Middle East. Many of these were important landmarks in the development of sustainable architecture. For instance, the Lighthouse was the UK's first net zero carbon house, the Helicon was an early sustainable office/retail building, and MediaCityUK was built as a sustainable community, verified by international sustainability regulator BREEAM (the first corporate building to achieve this).

The firm's recently completed and ongoing projects include the transformation of an urban block in London's Fitzrovia (Fitzroy Place), the completion of a new science building at the University of Hertfordshire, and the creation of new residential-led neighbourhoods of 1500 homes at Queen Elizabeth Olympic Park (East Wick and Sweetwater).

Sustainability

Sheppard Robson is known for sustainable architecture, which it helped to pioneer in the early 1990s with buildings like the Helicon and the Lighthouse, which was the UK's first net zero-carbon house. Lancaster Institute for the Contemporary Arts, completed in 2010, was the first college or university to win a BREEAM Outstanding rating for sustainability. The Helicon was an early sustainable office/shop building, and MediaCityUK was built as a sustainable community, verified by the international sustainability regulator BREEAM (the first corporate building to achieve this).

Company
Sheppard Robson has three offices in London, Manchester and Glasgow, and about three hundred and fifty employees, mostly architects.  Sheppard Robson Architects LLP trading as Sheppard Robson became a Limited Liability Partnership in 2014, also incorporating Sheppard Robson Limited and Sheppard Robson International as limited companies, all is run its nineteen partners.  At the moment, Sheppard Robson is the fourth biggest architectural practice in the UK.
Sheppard Robson has an interior design group, ID:SR, the largest integrated interior design group within a UK architecture practice, which has produced work for BBC North, Channel 4 and London Borough of Newham.
Although Sheppard Robson is best known for its modern looking high-impact buildings, the company headquarters is a refurbished piano factory hidden in a courtyard in Camden Town, London.

Major projects
Schools and universities
Churchill College, Cambridge
Loughborough University
Brunel University
City University
Manchester Polytechnic
Waingels College
Stockwell Park High School
London Business School
Lancaster Institute for Contemporary Arts (LICA)
Arts and media
BBC Broadcasting House
MediaCityUK
Tate Modern (executive architects)
Campus West
Offices
Salvation Army HQ
Toyota HQ
The Helicon
Motorola HQ
Siemens HQ Middle East
Royal Mint Court
One Fitzroy Place
245 Hammersmith Road
Barts Square
Interserve UK Hub
Retail
Armani at 1 the Avenue
The Helicon
1 Hanover Street (Apple's flagship in Europe)
Tesco-Love Lane development, Woolwich
Science and healthcare
Glaxo
[[Merck Sharp and Dohmel]
Nelson Mandela Children's Hospital
Scottish Centre for Regenerative Medicine (SCRM)
New Science Building, University of Hertfordshire
Life Sciences Building, University of Bristol
Residential
The Lighthouse
Barking Riverside
East Wick & Sweetwater
Fitzroy Place
79 Camden Road
103–109 Wardour Street
International
Nelson Mandela Children's’ Hospital
Minna Airport City
Siemens HQ Middle East
Interiors
London Borough of Newham
Channel 4 Headquarters
BBC North at MediaCity
Commonwealth Bank of Australia
KPMG Leeds
Arcadia Group Headquarters

References

External links
 Sheppard Robson's company website
 A detailed article about the Sheppard Robson's history by Martin Pawley

Architecture firms of the United Kingdom
Design companies established in 1938
1938 establishments in England